Awaswas, or Santa Cruz, is one of eight Ohlone languages. It was historically spoken by the Awaswas people, an indigenous people of California. 

Linguists originally called the language Santa Cruz after the mission in the area but it was renamed to Awaswas as part of a move in the late 1960s and early 1970s by graduate students at the University of California Berkeley to use native names for the Ohlone languages.

History 

The Awaswas lived in the Santa Cruz Mountains and along the coast of present-day Santa Cruz County from present-day Davenport to Aptos. Awaswas became the main language spoken at the Mission Santa Cruz. However, there is evidence that this grouping was more geographic than linguistic, and that the records of the "Santa Cruz Costanoan" language in fact represent several diverse dialects. A report from 1952 identified four different distinct forms of Costanoan and a more recent report from 2009 states, "No area in North America was more crowded with distinct languages and language families than central California at the time of Spanish contact." 

The Ohlone language group is broken into branches with the most related languages grouped together. Awaswas has been grouped in both the northern and southern branches with different research disagreeing on the best fitting classification. Some branches within the Ohlone language group have been described as being as similar to each other as different local dialects of Italian, while others, such as Rumsen, Mutsun, and Awaswas "were as closely related as French, Spanish, and Portuguese."

In 2012,  Tribal Chairman Valentin Lopez stated that "his great-great-grandmother was the last of the Awaswas speakers."

See also
 Ohlone tribes and villages in Santa Cruz Mountains

Notes

References 

 Kroeber, Alfred L. 1925. Handbook of the Indians of California. Washington, D.C: Bureau of American Ethnology Bulletin No. 78. (map of villages, page 465)
 Milliken, Randall. A Time of Little Choice: The Disintegration of Tribal Culture in the San Francisco Bay Area 1769-1910 Menlo Park, CA: Ballena Press Publication, 1995.  (alk. paper)
 Teixeira, Lauren. The Costanoan/Ohlone Indians of the San Francisco and Monterey Bay Area, A Research Guide. Menlo Park, CA: Ballena Press Publication, 1997. .
 Yamane, Linda, ed. 2002. A Gathering of Voices: The Native Peoples of the Central California Coast. Santa Cruz County History Journal, Number 5. Santa Cruz, CA: Museum of Art & History.

External links 

Ohlone languages
Extinct languages of North America
Santa Cruz, California